Relic: Guardians of the Museum is a British children's game show that originally aired on BBC One for the first ten episodes before moving to CBBC for the last three episodes and ran from 21 January to 29 March 2010.

Format
A ghostly 1920s British Museum tour guide named Agatha will guide three children from one town on a quest to help them defeat the evil Dark Lord, whose servants, cowled figures called the Dark Forces, glide the darkened corridors and display rooms of the museum. The children have only one night to discover a relic in the museum itself and they have to win three challenges, which each have a vision. If the children succeed in the final battle, they will be awarded the golden scarab and will become "Guardians of the Museum". But if they fail, they become relics themselves and part of the museum forever.

The Challenges
Agatha carries a torch which enables her and the children to travel back in time, where the three challenges; which are either physical or mental take place.  As well as the power of time-travel, Agatha's torch can also repel the Dark Forces if one of the children should be grabbed by them and freeze people into temporary immobility if they threaten to harm the contestants during a challenge.

If the children succeed in the challenge, then all three get to see the vision about a Relic that they will see. But if they fail, then only one of them gets to see the vision and the other two have to rely only on the memory of whoever that is.

The Relic
The series was produced to tie in with the Radio 4 series A History of the World in 100 Objects. The thirteen 'relics" are a selection from the hundred featured in the radio series, which in turn were selected from an estimated seven million in the British Museum collection.

The Final Battle
After the three challenges are over, Agatha takes the children to the museum's Great Court, where she summons the Dark Lord for the final battle. The contestants go face-to-face one at a time, where the team has to get three correct answers to questions set by the Dark Lord about the Relic they saw about the three visions. After the Dark Lord has asked his question and the contestant has given his/her answer, the appropriate part of the vision is then shown to see whether the contestant has answered correctly. A correct answer earns the team one of three 'passes', and the contestant is then told by the Dark Lord to go back to the others and wait to be called forward again. However, an incorrect answer or passing on a question results in the contestant being taken by the Dark Lord, disappearing and reappearing in a glass display case,. If all three children should end up being taken by the Dark Lord, then he has won and his darkness reigns, with the children remaining in the glass display case as part of the museum "Forever".  But if the children succeed in the final battle by getting all three passes without the entire team being taken, the Dark Lord has lost; he is banished, resulting in the contestant(s) taken by him being free. Agatha then awards each of them with a golden scarab, and informs them that they are now "Guardians of the Museum", bidding them farewell as they leave the museum at dawn.

Awards
In 2010 the show won a BAFTA award in the entertainment category.

Episodes
There are 13 episodes altogether. These are the episodes. Bold indicates guardians who answered all of their questions correctly in the final battle.

Newcastle: Natasha, Vanessa & Stacy (Won) Relic: The Benin Plaques
Hounslow: Damien, Tion & Raj (Lost) Relic: The Mummy Of Hornedijtef
Brighton: Nancy, Keishon & Remy (Won) Relic: The Game Of Ur
Edinburgh: Anthony, Sophie & Rory (Won) Relic: The Hoxne Hoard
Wandsworth: Kofi, Jade & Tom (Won) Relic: The Head Of Augustus
Leeds: Isaac, Georgia & Maryam (Lost) Relic: The Sutton Hoo Helmet
Islington: Lucas, Max & Lorelle (Won) Relic: The Pieces Of Eight
Hackney: Kesley, Robert & Rameen (Lost) Relic: The Bust of Ramesses
Enfield: Clinton, China & Jas (Won) Relic: The Double-headed Serpent
Birmingham: Mark, Wallis & Rachelle (Won) Relic: Dürer's Rhinoceros
Colchester: David, Harry & Ryan (Lost) Relic: The Tang Tomb Figures
Cardiff: Jude, Natalie & George (Lost) Relic: The Rosetta Stone
Bromley: George, Ellie & Charlotte (Won) Relic: Hoa Hakananai'a

Cast
 Gemma Arrowsmith as Agatha
 uncredited as the Dark Lord
 Helen Evans  as Cleopatra (intermittently)
 George Sawyer  as Roman Legionary Gluteus Maximus (intermittently)
 Jolana Lee as Pandora (intermittently)
 Sophia Maria as Princess (intermittently)

References

External links
 
 
 

2010 British television series debuts
2010 British television series endings
2010s British game shows
BBC children's television shows
BBC television game shows
English-language television shows
Television shows shot at BBC Elstree Centre